First Hand is the debut album released by Christian singer Steven Curtis Chapman. The album was released in 1987 by Sparrow Records and features the single "Weak Days".

The album features a blend of country music with soft rock and pop.

Track listing 
All songs written by Steven Curtis  Chapman, except where noted.
 "First Hand"  – 3:38
 "Weak Days"  – 4:20
 "Hiding Place"  – 4:49
 "Run Away" – 4:22
 "Do They Know" – 4:01
 "Tell Me" – 4:21
 "Who Cares"  – 5:07
 "Dying to Live" – 3:37
 "Said and Done" – 5:10
 "My Redeemer Is Faithful and True"  – 3:47

Personnel 
 Steven Curtis Chapman – lead vocals, backing vocals, guitars, guitar solo (8)
 Phil Naish – keyboards
 Jon Goin – guitars
 Mike Brignardello – bass
 Mark Hammond – drums
 Alan Moore – string orchestrations (5, 10)
 Carl Gorodetzsky – string leader (5, 10)
 The Nashville String Machine – strings (5, 10)
 Herb Chapman – backing vocals, featured backing vocal (5)
 Wayne Kirkpatrick – backing vocals
 Chris Rodriguez – backing vocals

Production 
 Phil Naish – producer
 Greg Nelson – executive producer
 Jeff Balding – engineer
 Mike Clute – assistant engineer
 Bill Whittington – assistant engineer
 Denny Purcell – mastering
 Cindy Wilt – production coordinator
 Mark Tucker – photography
 Buddy Jackson – design
 Barbara Catanzaro-Hearn – art direction
 Beth Middleworth – title illustration
 Jane Golden – cover image of Santa Monica mural

Studios
 The Bennett House, Franklin, Tennessee – recording studio
 OmniSound, Nashville, Tennessee – recording studio
 Hummingbird, Nashville, Tennessee – recording studio
 Gold Mine Studios, Nashville, Tennessee – recording studio
 Center Stage, Nashville, Tennessee – recording studio
 Downstage Studios, Nashville, Tennessee – recording studio
 Georgetown Masters, Nashville, Tennessee – mastering location

References 

Steven Curtis Chapman albums
1987 debut albums